Mythimna loreyimima (sugar cane armyworm) is a moth of the family Noctuidae. It is found in Asia, Australia and New Zealand. The term “Armyworm” is used because of their habit to spread out in a line across a lawn or pasture, and slowly “marching” forward, meanwhile consuming the foliage they encounter.

The wingspan is about 35 mm.

The larvae feed on agricultural plants, such as Saccharum officinarum and Poaceae species and are thus considered a pest.

References

External links
Species info

Mythimna (moth)
Moths of Asia
Moths of Australia
Moths described in 1900
Moths of New Zealand